CIHW-FM is a Canadian radio station, which broadcasts to the Huron-Wendat Nation. Broadcasting on 100.3 FM, CIHW is a community radio station operated by the Huron-Wendat Nation at Wendake, an enclave of First Nations land within Quebec City.

External links
 CIHW
 CIHW-FM history - Canadian Communication Foundation

Bingo Wendake Official website at this time (2023).
CIHW-FM - Online webcast

Ihw
Ihw
Year of establishment missing